Buein Zahra Technical University (BZTU) (BZTU) is an Iranian public university focused on technological and engineering courses, and located in Buin Zahra, Qazvin province, Iran. This university has become the best engineering institution in Iran. (BZTU) was founded in 2012, with 45 students enrolled in two bachelor's programs. (IKIU-BZTU) now has two faculties covering five technical groups, with 8000 students in 17 engineering courses. Since 2012, Mohammad Anisseh has been the chancellor of the university.

References

External links
 Buein Zahra Technical University official site (English)
 Buein Zahra Technical University official site (Persian)
 Buein Zahra Technical University official site (Persian)
 imam khomeini international University official site (Persian)

Engineering universities and colleges in Iran
Buin Zahra County
Education in Qazvin Province
Imam Khomeini International University